Ibrahim Sesay (born 18 October 2004) is a Sierra Leonean professional footballer who plays as a goalkeeper for the Sierra Leonean club Bo Rangers, and the Sierra Leone national team.

Career
Sesay began his senior career with the East End Lions, and transferred to Bo Rangers on 13 October 2021.

International career
Sesay de his international debut with the Sierra Leone national team in a 2–1 friendly win over The Gambia on 9 October 2021. He was part of the Sierra Leone squad the 2021 Africa Cup of Nations. At 17, he was the youngest player called up to the tournament.

References

External links
 
 

2004 births
Living people
Sportspeople from Freetown
Sierra Leonean footballers
Sierra Leone international footballers
East End Lions F.C. players
Association football goalkeepers
2021 Africa Cup of Nations players